Khirbet ar-Ras al-Ahmar is a small Palestinian village in the Tubas Governorate of the West Bank. The village is located in Area C of the West Bank, and Israel has designated it a closed military zone for weapons training. As of mid-2010, the village had 195 residents.

References

External links
Survey of Western Palestine, Map 12: IAA, Wikimedia commons
 Kh ar Ras al Ahmar Profile,   Applied Research Institute - Jerusalem (ARIJ)
 Kh ar Ras al Ahmar (Fact Sheet), ARIJ

Villages in the West Bank